Live 2003 may refer to:

Beer and Sandland Live 2003, a live album by Phil Beer and Deb Sandland
Coldplay Live 2003, a live album by Coldplay